The Parâng mountain group is a subgroup of mountains in the Southern Carpathians. It is named after the highest of the mountains in the group, the Parâng Mountains.

Boundaries
The Parâng group is bounded:
in the east, by the Olt River
in the west, by the Jiu River

Mountains
Parâng Mountains (Munții Parâng) 
Șureanu Mountains (Munții Șureanu/M. Sebeșului) 
Cindrel Mountains (Munții Cindrel/M. Cibinului) 
Lotru Mountains (Munții Lotrului; literally: Mountains of the Thief) 
Căpățână Mountains (Munții Căpățânii; literally: Mountains of the Head or Mountains of the Skull)

See also
Carpathian Mountains
Retezat-Godeanu Mountains group
Făgăraș Mountains group
Parângu Mare peak
Rânca

External links
 Small gallery from the Parang Mountains group
Maps of Parâng and other mountain ranges in the Transylvanian Alps
http://www.carpati.org/
http://www.alpinet.org/

Mountain ranges of Romania
Mountain ranges of the Southern Carpathians

ro:Grupa montană Şureanu-Parâng-Lotrului